James Hopkins Adams (March 15, 1812 – July 13, 1861) was an American politician who served as the 66th governor of South Carolina from 1854 to 1856. He also served in the South Carolina Legislature.

Early life and education 

Adams was born in Minervaville, South Carolina, in 1812 to Henry Walker Adams and Mary Goodwyn Adams. Both of his parents had died by the time James was three years old, and therefore he was raised by his grandfather, Joel Adams, the patriarch of the Adams family of South Carolina. He graduated from Yale College in 1831.

Career 
In 1832, he joined the South Carolina Nullification Convention which deliberated until 1833 on whether states could nullify federal laws. He was an opponent of nullification.

He was a member of the South Carolina House of Representatives from 1834 to 1837, 1840 to 1841, and 1848 to 1849.  In 1850, he was elected to the South Carolina Senate, where he stayed through 1853.  He served as a brigadier general of the South Carolina Militia.

In 1854, Adams was elected the 66th Governor of South Carolina, a position he held through December 1856. In 1856, he recommended a resumption of the foreign slave trade as a way of eliminating illicit trade. The legislature rejected this proposal.

He signed the articles of secession for South Carolina, The Ordinance of Secession, and served as a member of the commission to the United States government to negotiate the transfer of United States property in South Carolina to the state government.

Personal life 
He married Jane Margaret Scott in April 1832.  They had 11 children.  Among his many children was Lt. Colonel Warren Adams, of the Confederate States Army, who was in command of Battery Wagner, South Carolina during the American Civil War.

Death and legacy
He died on his plantation near Columbia, South Carolina, on July 13, 1861, and his remains were buried in Congaree, South Carolina.

References

External links

SCIway Biography of James Hopkins Adams
NGA Biography of James Hopkins Adams

1812 births
1861 deaths
Politicians from Charleston, South Carolina
Yale College alumni
Democratic Party members of the South Carolina House of Representatives
Democratic Party South Carolina state senators
Democratic Party governors of South Carolina
University of South Carolina trustees
19th-century American politicians
People from Richland County, South Carolina